Eunice de Souza (August 1, 1940 – July 29, 2017) was an Indian English language poet, literary critic and novelist. Among her notable books of poetry are Women in Dutch painting (1988), Ways of Belonging (1990), Nine Indian Women Poets (1997), These My Words (2012), and Learn From The Almond Leaf (2016). She published two novels, Dangerlok (2001), and Dev & SImran (2003), and was also the editor of a number of anthologies on poetry, folktales, and literary criticism.

Early life and education
Eunice de Souza was born and grew up in Pookkad in the Kozhikode district of Kerala, in a Goan Catholic family. She studied English literature with an MA from  Marquette University in Wisconsin, and a PhD from the University of Mumbai. She taught English at St. Xavier's College, Mumbai, and was Head of the Department until her retirement. She was involved in the well-known literary festival, Ithaka, organized at the college. She was involved in theater, both as actress and director, and began writing novels with her first, Dangerlok, published in 2001. She also wrote four children's books.

She hints at an ancestral Portuguese conversion in the poem de Souza Prabhu:
        No, I'm not going to
        delve deep down and discover
        I'm really de Souza Prabhu
        even if Prabhu was no fool
        and got the best of both worlds.
        (Catholic Brahmin!
        I can hear his fat chuckle still.)

Aside from poetry and fiction, de Souza edited numerous anthologies and collections and wrote a weekly column for the Mumbai Mirror. Her poetry is also included in Anthology of Contemporary Indian Poetry ( United States). 

She died on July 29, 2017, and was remembered as an inspiration to younger people.

Works 
Poetry
 Fix. (1979)
 Women in Dutch Painting. (1988)
 Ways of Belonging. (1990)
 Selected and New Poems. (1994)
 A Necklace Of Skulls. (2009)
 Learn from the Almond Leaf  (Poetrywala, 2016)

Novels
 Dangerlok. (Penguin, 2001)
 Dev & Simran: A Novel. (Penguin, 2003) review

Interviews
 Conversations with Indian Poets. (OUP, 2001) 

Edited
 Nine Indian Women Poets: An Anthology. (OUP, 2001) 
 101 Folktales From India. (2004)
 Purdah: An Anthology. (OUP, 2004) 
 Women's Voices: Selections from Nineteenth and Early Twentieth Century Indian Writing in English. (Co-edited with Lindsay Pereira, OUP, 2004)  review
 Early Indian Poetry in English: An Anthology 1829-1947. (OUP, 2005)  review
 The Satthianadhan Family Album. (Sahitya Akademi, 2005) review
 These My Words: The Penguin Book of Indian Poetry (Co-edited with Melanie Silgardo, Penguin 2012)

See also
 Indian English literature
Eunice de Souza - Critical Biography

References

External links

 Weekly Column at Mumbai Mirror
 Poems  & commentary 

1940 births
2017 deaths
21st-century Indian women writers
21st-century Indian writers
Indian Roman Catholics
Goan Catholics
Writers from Mumbai
Writers from Pune
English-language poets from India
Indian women poets
Indian stage actresses
Indian women novelists
Indian theatre directors
Indian women children's writers
Indian children's writers
Indian literary critics
21st-century Indian novelists
21st-century Indian poets
20th-century Indian women writers
20th-century Indian novelists
20th-century Indian poets
Women writers from Maharashtra
Indian women critics
Indian women theatre directors
Novelists from Maharashtra
Poets from Maharashtra